KS Pogradeci is a professional football club based in Pogradec, Albania. The club plays in the Kategoria e Dytë, which is the third tier of football in the country.

History
The club was founded in 1932 with name Klubi Sportiv Dragoj Pogradeci. In the 1936 season, the club played for the first time in the highest league in Albania. During the largest part of the communist era, the club was known as KS Ylli i Kuq Pogradeci. The greatest success of club history is the achievement of the semi-finals of the Albanian Cup in the 1992–93 season.

Name History

1932 - 1947: KS Dragoj Pogradeci

1947 - 1949: KS Spartak Pogradeci

1949 - 1950: KS Pogradeci

1950 - 1958: KS Spartak Pogradeci

1958 - 1992: KS Ylli i Kuq Pogradeci

1992 - recent: KS Pogradeci

Stadium

The club has played its home matches at the Gjorgji Kyçyku Stadium since 1932.

Honours and achievements
Kategoria e Parë
 Champions (3): 1963–64, 1990–91, 2010–11
Kategoria e Dytë
 Champions (2): 1959–60, 1984–85
Runners-up (1): 2003–04

Players

Current squad

Staff

Recent seasons

References

 KS Pogradeci Soccerway

 KS Pogradeci Matches

 KS Pogradeci Squad

 KS Pogradeci Statistics

 KS Pogradeci Transfers

 KS Pogradeci Trophies

 KS Pogradeci Venue

External links
FutbolliShqiptar.net 
Albanian Soccer News 

Pogradeci
Association football clubs established in 1932
1932 establishments in Albania
Sport in Pogradec
Albanian Third Division clubs
Kategoria e Dytë clubs